Karambeli railway station is a small railway station on the Western Railway network in the state of Gujarat, India. Karambeli railway station is 7 km away from Vapi railway station. Passenger and MEMU trains halt here.

See also
 Valsad district

References

Railway stations in Valsad district
Mumbai WR railway division